The Briggs-Detroiter (or more often, just the Detroiter) was an automobile manufactured in Detroit, Michigan, by the Briggs-Detroiter Motor Car Company from 1912 to 1917.  It was planned to be a bigger and better version of the Brush Runabout.

The Detroiter was a popular model, and many vehicles were sold.  The early models were built with a 32 hp, L-head engine.  A five-seater touring car was sold in 1915, and had a V-8 engine of 3.3L capacity, and sold for $1,295.  The car had radiators with curved cross-sections.

References
 
 Kimes, Beverly Rae and Clark Jr, Henry Austin.  Standard Catalog of American Cars: 1805-1942. (Third Edition). Iola, WI: Krause Publications. 1996.

Brass Era vehicles
Defunct motor vehicle manufacturers of the United States
Motor vehicle manufacturers based in Michigan
Defunct companies based in Michigan